The Independent Alliance for Reform was a political group in the Senedd. It was founded in October 2020, and had three members. The party was dissolved in 2021 when all three of its Senedd Members lost their seats in that year's election.

Membership 
The following Members of the Senedd were part of the group:

 Caroline Jones
 David Rowlands
 Mandy Jones

All were former members of UKIP and then of the Brexit Party. The group's leader was Caroline Jones, who was an independent, whilst David Rowlands and Mandy Jones were still  members of Reform UK, formerly known as the Brexit Party.

All three lost their seats at the 2021 Senedd election.

References

External links
Independent Alliance for Reform on Facebook
Independent Alliance for Reform on Twitter

Political parties in Wales
2020 establishments in Wales
Political parties established in 2020
2020 in British politics
Eurosceptic parties in the United Kingdom
Regionalist parties in the United Kingdom
2021 disestablishments in Wales
Political parties disestablished in 2021